The tawny-breasted wren-babbler (Spelaeornis longicaudatus) is a species of bird in the family Timaliidae.
It is endemic to the Khasi Hills of Northeast India.

Its natural habitat is subtropical or tropical moist montane forest.
It is threatened by habitat loss.

References

Collar, N. J. & Robson, C. 2007. Family Timaliidae (Babblers)  pp. 70 – 291 in; del Hoyo, J., Elliott, A. & Christie, D.A. eds. Handbook of the Birds of the World, Vol. 12. Picathartes to Tits and Chickadees. Lynx Edicions, Barcelona.

tawny-breasted wren-babbler
Birds of Northeast India
tawny-breasted wren-babbler
Taxonomy articles created by Polbot